is a Japanese footballer currently playing as a defensive midfielder for Gamba Osaka.

Career statistics

Club
.

Notes

References

External links

1997 births
Living people
Sportspeople from Shiga Prefecture
Association football people from Shiga Prefecture
Kwansei Gakuin University alumni
Japanese footballers
Association football midfielders
J1 League players
J3 League players
Sagawa Shiga FC players
Gamba Osaka players
Gamba Osaka U-23 players
21st-century Japanese people